The , or Nagoya harp, is a Japanese stringed musical instrument. The name derives from the Taishō period (1912–1926) when the instrument first appeared. It has also become naturalized in East Africa, often under the name Taishokoto.

History 

The Taishōgoto was developed in 1912 by the musician Gorō Morita in Nagoya. He had received a scholarship from the first prime minister of Japan to study music instruments in Europe and the United States for two years. He subsequently came up with the idea of combining the mechanics of a typewriter with an instrument.

The taishōgoto bears a close resemblance to the bulbul tarang from India, and the akkordolia from Germany, all sharing the same principle of using keys to press down on strings to change their pitch. It also bears some resemblance to the Swedish nyckelharpa for the same reason although the action and the method of playing the strings is very different.

The instrument was used by Krautrock band Neu! on its first album in 1972, and also by Harmonia which formed in 1973.

References

External links

 Bulbul Tarang of India
 Akkordolia of Germany

Typewriter zithers
Japanese musical instruments
Culture in Nagoya
East African musical instruments